William H. Spurgeon, III (1916 - 1970) was a Southern California businessman who worked to promote experientional learning through the Exploring program of the Boy Scouts of America. He was the grandson of William H. Spurgeon. In 1970 he received the Silver Buffalo Award for his contributions to Scouting.

Background
Born in Orange County, California, Surgeon was the grandson of William H. Spurgeon who founded the city of Santa Ana, California, and was on the county board of supervisors.
During World War II, Spurgeon served as a lieutenant with the Navy in the South Pacific. Following in the family business, Spurgeon went to work for the Irvine Company in the field of real estate development. In 1960, Spurgeon, working with the Irvine Company, partnered with William Pereira to develop the site plan for the proposal to bring the new UC campus to the Irvine Ranch.

In 1939 he married Kathleen "Kay" Higgins, with whom he had three children. They remained married until his death in 1970.

Having been a Boy Scout in his youth, Spurgeon's avocation was Scouting. Around 1950, while a board member of the Orange County Council of the Boy Scouts of America, Spurgeon arranged for the Irvine Company to offer part of the Irvine Ranch as the site for the 1953 National Scout Jamboree.

Spurgeon served on the National Executive Board of the Boy Scouts of America. His passion was the Exploring Program, and he led efforts to the promote the co-ed program. 
The William H. Spurgeon, III Award is the highest recognition for individuals and organizations contributing significant leadership to the Exploring Program.

Honors and awards
 William H. Spurgeon III Award, is the highest recognition for individuals and organizations contributing significant leadership to the Exploring program.
 1958 - Newport Beach Chamber of Commerce - Citizen of the Year Award

Further reading

References

External links
William H. Spurgeon

1916 births
1970 deaths
People from Orange County, California
20th-century American politicians
National Executive Board of the Boy Scouts of America members